¡Olé Tormé!: Mel Tormé Goes South of the Border with Billy May is a 1959 studio album by Mel Tormé, arranged by Billy May. It was one of many Latin-tinged jazz albums released in the late 1950s and early 1960s.

Track listing

Personnel 
 Mel Tormé – vocals, drums
 Frank Beach – trumpet
 Pete Candoli
 Conrad Gozzo
 Manny Klein
 Eddie Kusby – trombone
 Tommy Pederson
 Dave Wells
 Si Zentner
 Gene Cipriano – woodwind
 Chuck Gentry
 Justin Gordon
 Wilbur Schwartz
 Bud Shank
 Red Callender – tuba
 Verlye Mills – harp
 Jimmy Rowles – piano
 Al Pelligrini
 Bob Gibbons – guitar
 Ralph Peña – double bass
 Lou Singer – percussion, drums, marimba
 Alvin Stoller – drums
 Larry Bunker – drums, marimba
 Billy May – arranger, conductor
 Sheldon Marks – art direction
 William Rotsler – cover photo

References

Mel Tormé albums
1959 albums
Verve Records albums
Albums arranged by Billy May
Albums produced by Carl Jefferson
Albums conducted by Billy May
Covers albums